Wales A , also known as Wales Dragonhearts, is an amateur international rugby league side that competed in the Skanska Amateur Four Nations. The players are picked from the Conference League South clubs and from the domestic competition the South Wales Premiership league.

Wales have been the most successful side in this competition, winning the competition 8 times during its 12-year run. In 2014, a new competition the Celtic Nations Cup was contested by Wales A, Ireland A and Scotland A following England A withdrawal. Wales A are currently coached by Dafydd Hellard

Squad

The following squad was picked for the one off international friendly against England A in 2015

Results

See also

 Wales national rugby league team match results
 List of Wales national rugby league team players
 Amateur Four Nations

References 
 A results

External links 
 A results at walesrugbyleague.co.uk

Rugby league in Wales
Amateur rugby league
Rugby league-related lists
Wales national rugby league team
British rugby league lists
Wales sport-related lists
National rugby league second teams